John Alden Riner (October 12, 1850 – March 4, 1923) was a United States district judge of the United States District Court for the District of Wyoming.

Education and career

Born in Preble County, Ohio, Riner received a Bachelor of Laws from the University of Michigan Law School in 1879. He was in private practice in Cheyenne, Wyoming Territory from 1879 to 1884. He was a city attorney for Cheyenne from 1881 to 1884 and the United States Attorney for the Wyoming Territory from 1884 to 1886. He was a member of the Territorial Council for the Wyoming Territory in 1886, returning to private practice in Cheyenne, Wyoming Territory (State of Wyoming from July 10, 1890) from 1886 to 1890.

Federal judicial service

Riner was nominated by President Benjamin Harrison on September 20, 1890, to the United States District Court for the District of Wyoming, to a new seat authorized by 26 Stat. 222. He was confirmed by the United States Senate on September 22, 1890, and received his commission the same day. He assumed senior status on October 31, 1921. He was the last district judge who continued to serve in active service appointed by President Harrison. His service terminated on March 4, 1923, due to his death in Cheyenne.

References

Sources

External links
 The John A. Riner and William A. Riner papers at the American Heritage Center

1850 births
1923 deaths
People from Preble County, Ohio
Members of the Wyoming Territorial Legislature
19th-century American politicians
Judges of the United States District Court for the District of Wyoming
United States federal judges appointed by Benjamin Harrison
19th-century American judges
University of Michigan Law School alumni